36th BSFC Awards
December 11, 2015

Best Film: 
Spotlight

The 36th Boston Society of Film Critics Awards, honoring the best in filmmaking in 2015, were given on December 11, 2015.

Winners

 Best Film:
 Spotlight
 Runner-up: Mad Max: Fury Road
 Best Director:
 Todd Haynes – Carol
 Runner-up: Tom McCarthy – Spotlight
 Best Actor:
 Paul Dano – Love & Mercy (TIE)
 Leonardo DiCaprio – The Revenant (TIE)
 Best Actress:
 Charlotte Rampling – 45 Years
 Runner-up: Saoirse Ronan – Brooklyn
 Best Supporting Actor:
 Mark Rylance – Bridge of Spies
 Runner-up: Sylvester Stallone – Creed
 Best Supporting Actress:
 Kristen Stewart – Clouds of Sils Maria
 Runner-up: Alicia Vikander – The Danish Girl
 Best Screenplay:
 Tom McCarthy and Josh Singer – Spotlight
 Runner-up: Phyllis Nagy – Carol
 Best Original Score:
 Atticus Ross – Love & Mercy
 Runner-up: Ludwig Göransson – Creed
 Best Animated Film:
 Pete Docter – Inside Out (TIE)
 Charlie Kaufman and Duke Johnson – Anomalisa (TIE)
 Runner-up: Richard Starzak and Mark Burton – Shaun the Sheep Movie
 Best Foreign Language Film:
 Joshua Oppenheimer – The Look of Silence
 Runner-up: Kornél Mundruczó – White God
 Best Documentary:
 Joshua Oppenheimer – The Look of Silence
 Runner-up: Asif Kapadia – Amy
 Best Cinematography:
 Edward Lachman – Carol
 Runner-up: Emmanuel Lubezki – The Revenant
 Best Editing:
 Margaret Sixel – Mad Max: Fury Road
 Runner-up: Tom McArdle – Spotlight
 Best New Filmmaker:
 Marielle Heller – The Diary of a Teenage Girl
 Runner-up: Alex Garland – Ex Machina
 Best Use of Music in a Film:
 Love & Mercy
 Best Ensemble Cast:
 Spotlight
 Runner-up: The Big Short

External links
 2015 Winners

References

2014
2015 film awards
2015 awards in the United States
2015 in Boston
December 2015 events in the United States